Grant Park is a village in northeastern Kankakee County, Illinois, United States. Grant Park was incorporated in 1883. In 2010, Grant Park had a population of 1,331. It is part of the Kankakee–Bradley Metropolitan Statistical Area. Much of the town was destroyed by a cyclone in 1912, according to Frank Leslie's Weekly magazine, which ran pictures.

Geography
Grant Park is located at  (41.240656, -87.645842).

Demographics
According to the 2000 census, there were 1,358 people, 497 households, and 389 families residing in the village. The racial makeup of the village was 97.57% White, 0.07% African American, 0.07% Native American, 0.22% Asian, 0.81% from other races, and 1.25% from two or more races. Hispanic or Latino of any race were 2.72% of the population.

There were 497 households, out of which 39.8% had children under the age of 18 living with them, 63.8% were married couples living together, 11.3% had a female householder with no husband present, and 21.7% were non-families. 17.1% of all households were made up of individuals, and 8.0% had someone living alone who was 65 years of age or older. The average household size was 2.73 and the average family size was 3.09.

In the village, the population was spread out, with 28.4% under the age of 18, 7.0% from 18 to 24, 31.4% from 25 to 44, 21.6% from 45 to 64, and 11.6% who were 65 years of age or older. The median age was 36 years. For every 100 females, there were 94.6 males. For every 100 females age 18 and over, there were 91.2 males.

The median income for a household in the village was $52,153, and the median income for a family was $55,250. Males had a median income of $45,694 versus $22,750 for females. The per capita income for the village was $22,403. About 3.5% of families and 4.4% of the population were below the poverty line, including 5.0% of those under age 18 and 9.2% of those age 65 or over.

Weather Events

1912 Cyclone
In 1912 a large tornado swept through grant park destroying several homes in the northern portion of the village, injuring multiple residents.

1948 Tornado
A second large scale tornado struck grant park April 7, killing 3, and injuring 8. Extensive damage to homes and livestock was done. this tornado is considered the worst tornado in the history of Kankakee County.

1954 Tornado
On April 7, 1954, a third tornado caused one fatality, and two minor injuries. Several millions of dollars in damage was done.

2020 Tornado
On August 10, 2020, a relatively small tornado touched down in Grant Park. It caused major damage to trees and roofs along its path, which ended just nearing Lake Matonga. This tornado formed from the bigger August 2020 Midwest derecho.

Education

Grant Park contains a preschool, elementary school, middle school, and a high school.  The mascot for the elementary school, middle school, and high school is the Dragons and the colors are green and gold.

The high school followed a block schedule in which students attend four 87-minute class periods a day, but is now going back to 8 hours a day and tray lunches. 
As of 2014, the district's superintendent is Dr. John Palan, Matthew Maxwell is the high school and middle school principal, and Tracy Planeta is principal of the elementary school. As of early 2017, Matt Maxwell of BBCHS will be the principal after Sanidas' retirement.

Notable people
 Richard L. Alexander, World War II fighter ace, was born here

See also

 List of municipalities in Illinois

References

External links

 
 Grant Park Schools
 Chamber of Commerce
 Grant Park Library

Villages in Kankakee County, Illinois
Villages in Illinois
Populated places established in 1883